Paskerdūmiukas (formerly) is a village in Kėdainiai district municipality, in Kaunas County, in central Lithuania. According to the 2011 census, the village was uninhabited.

At the beginning of the 20th century there was one of two Paskerdūmys manors (known as Zacišė), a property of the Tyszkiewicz family.

Demography

References

Villages in Kaunas County
Kėdainiai District Municipality